Hadaka no Kokoro ("My Naked Heart") is an album recorded by female Japanese pop artist Misato Watanabe. It was released on July 1, 1998 by Sony Music Entertainment.

Track listings

♥ (Instrumental)
Unmei no Door (=Destiny's Door)
Taiyō ha Sitte iru (=Summer knows)
Kanojo (=Her)
Hadaka no Kokoro (=Naked Heart)
37.2 °C (Yume miru you ni Utai tai (=I want to sing like dreaming))
Welcome
Issho dane (=We will be together, won't we?)
Runner
Sugao (=Natural Face)
Hamming
Freedom Train
Myself

External links
Sony Music Entertainment - Official site for Watanabe Misato. 
Album Page - Direct link to page with song listing and music samples.

1998 albums
Misato Watanabe albums